Zazna is a village in Ganderbal district of Jammu and Kashmir, India. The village provides a number of apple varieties, including 'Delicious' and 'American'.  Zazna is somewhat between a village and a town, and is located on the Srinagar-Leh highway equidistant from Srinagar and Kangan, being nearly 25 km away from both. There is a fruit and vegetable Mandi in Zazna, where people from many local areas sell their fruits. There is also a playground suitable for cricket, football and volleyball. Agriculture is the main source of economy. The major part of income of the inhabitants comes from apples and other fruits such as cherries, pears and walnut. On one side of Zazna are high mountains which serve as grasslands for cattle grazing.

References

Villages in Ganderbal  district